The 2006 UCF Golden Knights football team represented the University of Central Florida in the 2006 NCAA Division I FBS football season. Their head coach was George O'Leary, in his third season with the team. They played in Conference USA, in the East Division.

After a surprise showing in 2005, where they went 7–1 in C-USA and 8–3 in the regular season overall, UCF suffered a bit of a letdown, going 4–8 in 2006 under the new 12-game regular season schedule, and 3–5 in-conference. Their sole non-conference win came against I-AA Villanova. Part of the problem was the transition from a pass-dominated offense led by graduated wide receiver Brandon Marshall to a run-dominated offense led by sophomore running back Kevin Smith.

2006 was the final season that UCF would play at the aging Camping World Stadium. Already under construction was a new 45,000-seat on-campus stadium, which would open in time for the 2007 season. It would also be the final year that UCF would play under the "Golden Knights" nickname. They would drop "Golden" before the 2007 season, becoming simply the UCF Knights, and would soon unveil an updated logo.

One of the highlights of the season was a last-second, nationally televised victory at Marshall on October 4. UCF kicker Michael Torres kicked a go-ahead field goal with eight seconds left, but removed his helmet on the field of play, suffering an excessive celebration penalty. Despite the tense moment, the UCF special teams was able to hold off on the ensuing kickoff. The Golden Knights upset Marshall on the night they celebrated the release of the film We Are Marshall, with the film's star Matthew McConaughey in attendance.

Schedule

References

UCF
UCF Knights football seasons
UCF Golden Knights football